The 2020 Chattanooga Red Wolves SC season is the second season in the soccer team's history, where they compete in the third division of American soccer, USL League One, the second season of that competition. Chattanooga Red Wolves SC will also participate in the 2020 U.S. Open Cup. Chattanooga Red Wolves SC will play their home games at CHI Memorial Stadium in East Ridge, Tennessee, United States, moving from their previous stadium, David Stanton Field. Matches were played under reduced capacity due to the ongoing COVID-19 pandemic and stadium construction.

Club

Roster 
.

Coaching staff

Competitions

Exhibitions

USL League One

Standings

Results summary

Results by round

Match results

U.S. Open Cup 

As a USL League One club, Chattanooga will enter the competition in the Second Round, to be played April 7–9.

References

Chattanooga Red Wolves SC seasons
Chattanooga Red Wolves SC
Chattanooga Red Wolves SC
Chattanooga Red Wolves SC